The Regius Chair of Botany at the University of Glasgow is a Regius Professorship established in 1818.

A lectureship in botany had been founded in 1704. From 1718 to 1818, the subject was combined with Anatomy. The chair was founded in 1818 by King George III.

Regius Professors of Botany
 For 1718–1818, see: Regius Professor of Anatomy
 Robert Graham MD (1818)
 Sir William Jackson Hooker MA LLD DCL FRS (1820)
 John Hutton Balfour MA MD (1841)
 George Arnott Walker-Arnott MA LLD, Advocate (1845)
 Alexander Dickson MA MD (1868)
 Sir Isaac Bayley Balfour MA MD DSc FRS (1879)
 Frederick Orpen Bower MA ScD LLD FRS (1885)
 James Montague Frank Drummond MA (1925)
 John Walton MA DSc ScD D-es-Sc LLD (1930)
 Percy Wragg Brian BA PhD DPhil (1963)
 John Harrison Burnett MA DPhil (1968)
 Malcolm Barrett Wilkins PhD DSc FRSE (1970)
 Michael Robert Blatt BSc PhD FRSE (2001)

References
Who, What and Where: The History and Constitution of the University of Glasgow.  Compiled by Michael Moss, Moira Rankin and Lesley Richmond)

See also
List of Professorships at the University of Glasgow

Botany, Regius
1818 establishments in Scotland
Botany, Glasgow
Botany, Regius, Glasgow